Halomonas titanicae is a gram-negative, halophilic species of bacteria which was isolated in 2010 from rusticles recovered from the wreck of the RMS Titanic. It has been estimated by Henrietta Mann, one of the researchers that first isolated it, that the action of microbes like Halomonas titanicae may bring about the total deterioration of the Titanic by 2030. While the bacteria have been identified as a potential danger to oil rigs and other man-made objects in the deep sea, they also have the potential to be used in bioremediation to accelerate the decomposition of shipwrecks littering the ocean floor.

Cell morphology 
Halomonas titanicae is a gram-negative, rod-shaped bacterium that produces peritrichous flagella. It is catalase and oxidase positive. It has been found to form biofilms and some strains are capable of oxidation of thiosulfate, which is regulated by quorum sensing. It is able to withstand high osmotic pressure due to producing molecules like ectoine, hydroxyectoine, betaine, and glycine.

Importance in corrosion 
Halomonas titanicae is involved in the corrosion of steel by reducing Fe(III) to Fe(II) when oxygen is not available as an electron acceptor. However, when in aerobic conditions, it helps to inhibit corrosion by consuming dissolved oxygen. In the case of the Titanic and other shipwrecks, the bacteria accelerate the corrosion of these structures since levels of dissolved oxygen deep in the ocean are very low.

References

External links
Type strain of Halomonas titanicae at BacDive –  the Bacterial Diversity Metadatabase

Oceanospirillales
RMS Titanic
Bacteria described in 2010